Vasilyevka 1-ya is a rural locality (a selo) in Verkhnekhavskoye Rural Settlement, Verkhnekhavsky District, Voronezh Oblast, Russia. The population was 337 as of 2010. There are 3 streets.

Geography 
Vasilyevka 1-ya is located 14 km southeast of Verkhnyaya Khava (the district's administrative centre) by road. Verkhnyaya Maza is the nearest rural locality.

References 

Rural localities in Verkhnekhavsky District